Dressing Funny is an American web series talk show hosted by Tan France. It streams on Netflix' YouTube channel, Netflix Is a Joke. The series premiered on June 21, 2019.

The series won The Webby People's Voice award as best variety program in May 2020.

Episodes

Season 1 (2019)

Season 2 (2019–20)

References

External links
 

English-language Netflix original programming
2010s American comedy television series
2019 American television series debuts
2020 American television series endings